Private Paradise Secondary School ('PPSS' in short) is a private school system based in Bahrabise-8, Sindhupalchok, Nepal near the banks of Bhote Koshi river. It is an educational organisation established in 2004 AD under the Company Act 2057 under Educational Amendment 2057 of Nepal.

The school offers education up to secondary level i.e. SLC. It also offers Chinese language course which is supported by the Chinese Embassy in Nepal.

It is counted as one of the top schools in Sindhupalchok district for its good result in SLC examination. The school is also known for its good performance in various programs held by the Chinese Embassy in Nepal.

Educational institutions established in 2004
Secondary schools in Nepal
Buildings and structures in Sindhupalchowk District
2004 establishments in Nepal